John August Taffin (born May 2, 1939) is an American author from Boise, Idaho who writes several columns for gun magazines including Guns, Gun Digest, Sixgunner, Shoot! and American Handgunner.  A former math teacher from 1964-1995, Taffin is regarded as an authority on single-action revolvers, handloading, handgun hunting, big-bore revolvers, and metallic silhouette shooting.  Taffin has authored five books and over 500 published articles.  His monthly published gun columns include: Siluetas, Campfire Tales, The Sixgunner, and Taffin Tests.

Taffin is widely regarded as an authority on revolvers, magnum cartridge load development, firearms rights and handguns in general.

In 2008 Taffin was instrumental in opening the Elmer Keith Museum in Boise, Idaho.  The museum is located inside the local Cabela's retail location.

Writing
Taffin's influences on his writing style were Elmer Keith and Skeeter Skelton.  His first article appeared in the November 1967 edition of GUNsport.  He wrote several other articles for the magazine until it ceased publication in 1969.  Taffin went on to write for JD Jones's newsletter for Handgun Hunters International called The Sixgunner and Elgin Gates's newsletter for International Handgun Metallic Silhouette Association (IHMSA) titled The Silhouette in 1979.  Taffin's first article for Guns magazine appeared in the December 1983 issue and in May 1984 he became a staff writer for the publication.  In 1985, he became a staff writer for their sister publication: American Handgunner.

Bibliography

References

External links
Archive of Taffin's Gun Digest articles
Taffin Tests archive from American Handgunner

Living people
Gun writers
American magazine staff writers
Writers from Boise, Idaho
1939 births
American male non-fiction writers